The Facts of Life is a 1960 romantic comedy starring Bob Hope and Lucille Ball as married people who have an affair. Written, directed and produced by longtime Hope associates Melvin Frank and Norman Panama, the film is more serious than many other contemporary Hope vehicles. The film features an opening animated title sequence created by Saul Bass.

The film was nominated for five Academy Awards, winning one for Best Costume Design (for Edith Head and Edward Stevenson). Lucille Ball was nominated for a Golden Globe for Best Actress – Comedy.

Plot
As the yearly vacation of six neighbors, the Gilberts, Masons and Weavers, approaches, Kitty Weaver and Larry Gilbert find themselves frustrated with the routine. When their spouses are kept away from the vacation, Kitty and Larry find themselves alone in Acapulco, with the Masons bedridden with illness. Forced together, Kitty and Larry fall in love. However, when the vacation is over, they face difficulties deciding whether to continue the romance. They can't bear seeing each other at their usual social activities, without being together. This leads to a rendezvous at the drive-in movie,  where they are recognized, followed by a botched visit to a local motel with humorous consequences. They arrange a weekend together in Monterey, and Kitty leaves behind a note for Jack telling him she is leaving him. The bungalow with a leaky roof rented by Larry becomes the backdrop for their gradual realization that leaving their families is much more complicated, and Larry and Kitty are much less compatible than they thought. The result is a madcap race back home to retrieve Kitty's breakup note before her husband Jack reads it.

Cast
 Bob Hope as Larry Gilbert
 Lucille Ball as Kitty Weaver
 Ruth Hussey as Mary Gilbert
 Don DeFore as Jack Weaver
 Louis Nye as Hamilton Busbee
 Philip Ober as Doc Mason
 Marianne Stewart as Connie Mason
 Hollis Irving as Myrtle Busbee

Reception
In a positive contemporary review in The New York Times, critic Bosley Crowther called the script "... a wonderfully good-humored estimation of an essentially pathetic state of affairs" and wrote: "It is a grandly good-natured picture, full of thoroughly sparkling repartee and word-gags and sight-gags that crackle with humor and sly intelligence."

In 1964, Stanley Kauffmann of The New Republic wrote that the film "... was probably Bob Hope's best picture."

Awards and nominations

References

External links
 
 
 
 
 

1960 films
1960 romantic comedy films
Adultery in films
American romantic comedy films
American black-and-white films
1960s English-language films
Films about vacationing
Films directed by Norman Panama
Films directed by Melvin Frank
Films that won the Best Costume Design Academy Award
United Artists films
Films scored by Leigh Harline
1960s American films